The 1959 Individual Speedway World Championship was the 14th edition of the official World Championship to determine the world champion rider.

The event was sponsored by the Sunday Pictorial. New Zealand continued their recent domination as Ronnie Moore won his second title with a 15 point maximum and New Zealand won their fourth title in six years. Ove Fundin finished second and defending champion Barry Briggs, returning from retirement won the bronze medal ride off.

First round
Scandinavian Qualifying - 16 to Scandinavian Final
Continental Qualifying - 16 to Continental Final

Scandinavian Qualifying

Continental Qualifying

Second round
Ove Fundin - seeded to European Final
British & Commonwealth Qualifying - 32 to British & Commonwealth semi-finals
Nordic Final - 9 to European Final
Continental Final - 6 to European Final

British & Commonwealth Qualifying
Top 32 riders based on points accumulated during round would progress

Nordic Final
 May 31, 1959
 Turku
 First 9 to European Final

Continental Final
 June 21, 1959
  Munich
 First 6 to European Final

Third round
Barry Briggs - seeded to World Final
British & Commonwealth semi-finals - 9 to World Final
European Final - 6 to World Final

British & Commonwealth Semi finals
Top 9 riders based on points accumulated over two rides would progress

+ indicates qualifier for World Final (Aub Lawson was the ninth rider to qualify)

European Final
 July 17, 1959
 Göteborg
 First 6 to World final plus 1 reserve

World Final
19 September 1959
 London, Wembley Stadium

References

1959
Individual World Championship
Individual Speedway World Championship
Individual Speedway World Championship
Speedway competitions in the United Kingdom